Muma of MUMA may refer to:

Museums

Ángel María de Rosa Municipal Museum of Art in Junin, Argentina
Monash University Museum of Art in Melbourne, Australia
Museum Maluku in Utrecht, the Netherlands
Museum of modern art André Malraux - MuMa in Le Havre, France
 Musée MuMa, Museum of Mayotte, in Dzaoudzi, Mayotte, France

People
Fyah Muma, another name for Queen Ifrica, musician
Muma Gee, singer and actress
Walter Muma, Canadian moped rider
Muma, a nickname for Victor Bernardez, Honduran footballer
Austin "muma" Wilmot, formerly Overwatch League player for the Houston Outlaws
Chad Muma (born 1999), American football player

Other
Muma (Celtic goddess)
Muma River, China

See also 
Moma River in Russia
Mumu (computer worm)